The 1908 Maryland Aggies football team represented Maryland Agricultural College (later part of the University of Maryland) in the 1908 college football season. The Aggies compiled a 3–8 record, were shut out by seven of eleven opponents, and were outscored by all opponents, 204 to 27. William Lang was the team's coach.

Schedule

References

Maryland
Maryland Terrapins football seasons
Maryland Aggies football